This is a list of notable avocado dishes and foods, comprising dishes and foods prepared using avocado as a primary ingredient.

Avocado dishes
 Avocado and milk in ice (abukado lamaw) - a traditional Filipino dessert made from avocado chunks in milk and sugar, served chilled.
 Avocado bread
 Avocado cake – a cake prepared using avocado as a primary ingredient, together with other typical cake ingredients.
 Avocado fries – a type of fries dish prepared using avocado instead of potatoes.
 Avocado oil – used as an ingredient in other dishes and as a cooking oil.
 Avocado salad
 Avocado sauce – a mass-produced product.
 Avocado cream – a type of avocado sauce that can be prepared using mashed avocados, cream or sour cream, and other ingredients.
 Avocado key lime pie - an uncooked pie made with sweetened avocado, coconut cream and key lime juice in a baked chopped nut and date crust
 Avocado soup – can be prepared and served cold or hot
 Avocado toast –  an open sandwich prepared using mashed avocado on toast.
 Avocado tofu donburi - an Asian "rice bowl dish" consisting of avocado, tofu, okra or other ingredients simmered together and served over rice.
 Deep-fried avocado – avocado that has been breaded or battered and deep-fried. The dish can be stuffed with meats, cheese and other ingredients.
 Féroce – also referred to as "féroce d'avocat", it is prepared using mashed avocados, olive oil and lime juice, with salt cod, garlic, chili peppers, hot sauce and seasonings blended in. It can be used as a spread on various foods. Other seafoods can be used to prepare féroce, and it is a popular dish in Martinique, an insular region of France.
 Guacamole – an avocado-based dip or salad first created by the Aztecs in what is now Mexico.
 Guasacaca – a Venezuelan avocado-based sauce.
 Stuffed avocado
 Western-style sushi
 California roll
 Rainbow roll
 Seattle roll

Beverages

 Avocado milkshake (also called "avocado shake" or "avocado smoothie") - the smoothie version of the Filipino avocado lamaw. It uses the same ingredients of milk and sugar (and optionally crushed ice), but the avocado is puréed or mashed.
 Avocado margarita – a margarita prepared with muddled or blended avocado. Guacamole can be used in its preparation.
 Avolatte – a milk coffee in the shell of an avocado, with avocado flesh (originally a joke).
 Jus alpukat – literally means avocado juice. An Indonesian drink.

See also

 List of butter dishes
 Lists of foods
 Veganism

References

 
Avocado